The Men's pursuit competition at the Biathlon World Championships 2020 was held on 16 February 2020.

Results
The race was started at 15:15.

References

Men's pursuit